The 2018–19 Taça de Angola was the 37th edition of the Taça de Angola, the second most important and the top knock-out football club competition in Angola following the Girabola.  The competition returns after having not been played in 2018 due to the transitional calendar.

The winner qualifies to the 2019–20 CAF Confederation Cup.

Stadia and locations

Preliminary rounds

Round of 16

Quarter-finals

Semifinals

Final

Goalscorers

See also
 2018–19 Girabola
 2019–20 Angola Super Cup
 2019–20 CAF Confederation Cup

External links
 profile at girabola.com

References

Angola Cup
Cup
Angola